The 1996 Tunceli bombing was a suicide bombing targeting a group of 60 unarmed military personnel who was there for a flag raising ceremony in Tunceli, Turkey on 30 June 1996. The explosion resulted in deaths of eight soldiers (Ali Alıç, Cafer Akıncı, Hakan Akyar, Celal Hatıl, İbrahim Sever, Önder Yağmur, Ahmet Yayman and Yusuf Yıldırım) and Zeynep Kınacı, who was identified as the assailant. 29 soldiers were injured in the attack. It was the first suicide bombing in history of Turkey.

References 

Terrorist incidents in Turkey in 1996
1996 in Turkey
Kurdish–Turkish conflict (1978–present)
Terrorist incidents in Turkey
History of Tunceli Province
June 1996 events in Turkey
Suicide bombings in 1996
1996 crimes in Turkey